Sarah Bellum or Sara Bellum may refer to:

 Animated fictional characters:
 Sara Bellum (The Powerpuff Girls),  mayor's secretary in Cartoon Network series 
 Sara Bellum (Where on Earth Is Carmen Sandiego?), in animated television series 
 Sara Bellum (Darkwing Duck), scientist in Disney series 
 SaraBellum Records, sublabel of 5 Minute Walk
 In the credits to A Prairie Home Companion, Garrison Keillor states the show is "written by Sarah Bellum" in a joking reference to his own brain (cerebellum)

See also 
 Cerebellum, a structure at the rear of the vertebrate brain, beneath the cerebrum